Self Assured (foaled 26 October 2015) is a New Zealand Standardbred racehorse, notable for winning the New Zealand Trotting Cup in 2020 and the Auckland Trotting Cup in 2019 and 2022. 

Bred by R. N. Caldow and owned by Mrs Jean Feiss from Melbourne, Australia, he is trained by the All Stars stable at Rolleston.

Notable performances by Self Assured include:
 1st in the 2019 South East Derby at Albion Park
 1st in the 2019 Queensland Derby beating Lochinvar Art and Jesse Duke.
 3rd in the 2019 Ashburton Flying Stakes behind Spankem and Thefixer
 1st in the 2019 Auckland Pacing Cup beating Thefixer and Triple Eight
 1st in the 2020 Hondo Grattan Stakes, beating Demon Delight and Max Delight
 1st in the 2020 Canterbury Classic, beating Spankem and Tango Tara
 2nd in the 2020 Ashburton Flying Stakes behind Copy That, with Spankem 3rd
 1st in the 2020 New Zealand Trotting Cup beating Spankem and Ashley Locaz
 2nd in the 2020 Chariots Of Fire behind Lochinvar Art with Max Delight 3rd
 2nd in the 2020 Ballarat Cup behind AGs White Socks with Chase Auckland 3rd
 1st in the 2021 Easter Cup, beating Spankem and Amazing Dream
 3rd in the 2021 Canterbury Classic behind South Coast Arden and Pembrook Playboy
 1st in the 2021 Ashburton Flying Stakes, beating Classie Brigade and Pembrook Playboy
 2nd in the 2021 New Zealand Trotting Cup behind Copy That, with South Coast Arden 3rd
 2nd in the 2021 New Zealand Free For All behind South Coast Arden, with Krug third.
 3rd in the 2022 Noel J Taylor Memorial Mile behind Spankem and Hot And Treacherous
 2nd in the 2022 New Zealand Messenger Championship behind Majestic Cruiser, with A G's White Socks 3rd
 1st in the 2022 Auckland Pacing Cup, driven by Natalie Rasmussen due to Mark Purdon being suspended, beating Spankem and Kango.
 1st in the 2022 (inaugural) Roy Purdon Memorial Handicap beating Kango and Bad To The Bone
 3rd in the 2022 Canterbury Classic behind B D Joe and Spankem
 5th in the 2022 New Zealand Trotting Cup after suffering a flat tyre, behind Copy That and Majestic Cruiser
 1st in the 2022 New Zealand Free For All beating Majestic Cruiser and Old Town Road
 2nd in the 2022 Summer Cup Free For All behind BD Joe, with Spankem 3rd
 2nd in the 2022 Invercargill Cup behind Krug, with Macandrew Aviator 3rd

See also
 Harness racing in New Zealand

References

2015 racehorse births
New Zealand standardbred racehorses
New Zealand Trotting Cup winners
Auckland Pacing Cup winners
Rolleston, New Zealand